National pension may refer to:

 A pension system of a nation
 National Pension (Japan)
 National Pension Service of South Korea
 National Pension System of India

See also
Social Security (disambiguation)